Tomlinson is a surname. Notable people with the name include:

Alys Tomlinson (born 1975), British photographer
Ambrose Jessup Tomlinson, founder of the Church of God of Prophecy
Bob Tomlinson, English professional footballer
Sir Bernard Tomlinson, neuropathologist
Charles Tomlinson (1927–2015), British poet and translator
Charles Tomlinson (scientist)
Chris Tomlinson, British long jumper
Claire Tomlinson, presenter for Sky Sports
Craig Tomlinson, Jamaican soccer player
Dalvin Tomlinson, American football player
David Tomlinson, English actor
Denis Tomlinson, Rhodesian cricketer 
Eleanor Tomlinson, English actress
Eric Arthur Tomlinson, music recording engineer
Ernest Tomlinson (1924-2015), English composer
Frank Tomlinson, English footballer
Fred Tomlinson (singer) 1927–2016,singer
G. A. Tomlinson, British physicist after whom the Tomlinson model is named
G. H. Tomlinson, Canadian inventor of the chemical pulp process recovery boiler
 George Tomlinson (1890-1952), British Labour politician, Member of Parliament, Minister of Works and Minister of Education
 George Tomlinson (bishop), (1794–1863) an English cleric who served as Anglican Bishop of Gibraltar 
Gerald Tomlinson, New Jersey author
Gideon Tomlinson, of the Tomlinson Bridge of Fair Haven
Graeme Tomlinson, English footballer
Harold Tomlinson, British architect
Henry Major Tomlinson (1873–1958), a British writer and journalist
Ian Tomlinson, a British newspaper vendor who died in central London after being beaten by police during the 2009 G-20 protests
Ian Tomlinson (athlete), Australian athlete
Ike Tomlinson (1910–2000), head coach of the Arkansas State college football program
Isaac Tomlinson (1880–1970), English footballer with Chesterfield, Southampton and Portsmouth
James Tomlinson, English cricketer
Jane Tomlinson, British campaigner and fund raiser for cancer charities
Jeff Tomlinson, Canadian-German ice hockey coach
Jimmy Tomlinson, English footballer
John Tomlinson
John Tomlinson (educationalist) (1932–2005), British educationalist
John Tomlinson (bass) (born 1946), English opera singer
John Tomlinson, Baron Tomlinson (born 1939), Lord Tomlinson of Walsall, former MP and MEP
John Tomlinson (comics), comics writer for 2000 AD
Kelby Tomlinson, baseball player for The San Francisco Giants 
Kerry-Anne Tomlinson (born 1990), New Zealand cricketer
Kenneth Tomlinson, American government official
LaDainian Tomlinson, American football player
Laken Tomlinson, American football player
Louis Tomlinson (born 1991), member of the boy band One Direction
LeShay Tomlinson, American actress
Mel Tomlinson, American dancer and choreographer
Michael Tomlinson, British Conservative Party politician, MP for Mid Dorset and North Poole since 2015
Murphy Tomlinson, American curler
Paul Tomlinson, English footballer
P. B. Tomlinson, British botanist
Pride Tomlinson (1890–1967), Justice of the Tennessee Supreme Court 
Ray Tomlinson (1941-2016), American inventor, originator of the '@' separator used in e-mail addressing
Reg Tomlinson (1914–1971), English footballer with Grimsby and Southampton
Richard Tomlinson, former British MI6 officer
Richard Allan Tomlinson (born 1932), British archaeologist
Richard H. Tomlinson, Canadian philanthropist
Ricky Tomlinson, British actor
Roger Tomlinson, originator of the Geographic Information Systems
Sandra Tomlinson (born 1947), Australian basketball player
Stuart Tomlinson (born 1985), English footballer
Taylor Tomlinson (born 1993), comedian 
Teresa Tomlinson (born 1965), politician from Georgia
Theresa Tomlinson (or Thomlinson), children's author
Tommy Tomlinson, Pennsylvania State Senator
Tommy Tomlinson (footballer), English footballer
Trent Tomlinson, American country music singer-songwriter

See also
Thomlinson, surname
Tomlinson (given name)